Patrício Freire (born July 7, 1987, in Natal, Brazil), known professionally by his ring name Patrício Pitbull, is a Brazilian mixed martial artist currently competing in Bellator MMA where he is the current three-time Bellator Featherweight Champion and former Bellator Lightweight Champion. He is the younger brother of lightweight fighter Patricky Pitbull. He is the second-ever simultaneous two-weight champion in Bellator MMA history. As of April 19, 2022, he is No. 1 in the Bellator men's pound-for-pound rankings.

He is currently ranked as the No. 4 featherweight in the world by Fight Matrix, having been ranked as high as No. 3 in October 2020. Combat Press ranks him as the No. 5 featherweight, No. 5 lightweight and No. 9 pound-for-pound fighter in the world. Sherdog ranks him as the No. 6 lightweight and No. 7 featherweight fighter in the world. He is also ranked as the No. 1 featherweight fighter outside of the UFC by Ranking MMA.

Background
Freire was born and grew up in the outskirts of Natal, Brazil. Freire began training Brazilian jiu-jitsu at the age of ten to help fend off the stigma of his size. As a teenager, he trained at the famed Chute Boxe academy alongside notable MMA stars such as Wanderlei Silva and Mauricio Rua.

Mixed martial arts career

Early career
Freire made his professional MMA debut in March 2004 at the age of 16. For the first five and a half years of his career, he competed in his native Brazil and amassed an undefeated record of 12–0 with all but two wins coming by way of stoppage.

Prior to signing with Bellator, Freire was ranked as one of the top prospects outside of the North American fight scene.

Bellator MMA

Debut and Featherweight tournament
After stringing together an impressive undefeated record on the local Brazilian circuit, he was initially tabbed to make his American debut against Will Romero at Bellator 14 on April 15, 2010, in the Bellator Featherweight Tournament.
. However, the bout was postponed to take place a week later at Bellator 15 on April 22, 2010. He won the quarterfinal bout via first-round submission.

At Bellator 18 on May 13, 2010, he won his semifinal bout against fellow Brazilian and former EliteXC Featherweight Champion, Wilson Reis via unanimous decision.

Freire faced Joe Warren on June 24, 2010, at Bellator 23 in the Tournament Final. Despite nearly finishing the fight in the waning moments of the first round, Freire lost the fight by split decision.

Bellator Season Four
In Bellator Season Four, Freire earned back-to-back third-round KOs against Georgi Karakhanyan and Wilson Reis (a rematch of their bout the previous year) to advance to the finals of the Featherweight Tournament. Freire met Daniel Mason-Straus in the Bellator Season Four Featherweight Tournament Final at Bellator 45. He won the fight via unanimous decision and earned a title shot rematch against Joe Warren.

First title shot
The title shot was scheduled to take place at Bellator 47 on July 23, 2011, but a broken hand suffered in training had halted Freire's rematch with Joe Warren for the Bellator Featherweight Championship.

After a near year and a half lay-off, Freire returned to action at Bellator 85 on January 17, 2013, to face Pat Curran who had defeated Joe Warren to win the Bellator Featherweight Championship at Bellator 60. After a back and forth fight, Freire ended up losing a very close split decision.

Bouncing back to Bellator Season Nine
Freire was set to face Rob Emerson at Bellator 97 on July 31, 2013, but Emerson was forced out of the bout due to injury and was replaced by Jared Downing. Freire won via KO at fifty-four seconds into the second round.

Freire faced former UFC featherweight contender Diego Nunes at Bellator 99 on September 13, 2013, in the Quarterfinals of Bellator's Season Nine Featherweight Tournament. He won the fight via knockout in the first round.

Freire faced Fabricio Guerreiro in the semifinals at Bellator 103 on October 11, 2013, and won via unanimous decision.

Freire faced Justin Wilcox in the tournament final at Bellator 108 November 15, 2013. He won the fight via TKO in the first round.

First reign as Bellator Featherweight World Champion
After being skipped over for his title shot, Freire was expected to finally challenge for the Bellator Featherweight World Championship in the long-awaited rematch with Pat Curran on June 6, 2014, at Bellator 121. However, on May 21, it was announced that Curran had pulled out of the bout due to a calf injury. The rematch eventually took place at Bellator 123 on September 5, 2014. Freire defeated Curran by unanimous decision to become the new Bellator Featherweight Champion.

Freire made his first title defense at Bellator 132 on January 16, 2015 against Daniel Mason-Straus in a rematch of their bout in May 2011, which saw Freire walk away with a decision victory. Freire won the back-and-forth fight in the fourth round via a rear-naked choke submission.

Freire was expected to defend his featherweight title against former WSOF Featherweight Champion Georgi Karakhanyan in a rematch at Bellator 138 on June 19, 2015. However, after a torn ACL suffered by Karakhanyan, Freire will instead face Bellator Season Ten Featherweight tournament winner Daniel Weichel at the event. Despite being knocked down in the last seconds of the first round, Freire rallied to knock out Weichel with a perfect counter left hook early in the second round.

Losing the Championship and return to contender status
Freire had a third fight with Straus on November 6, 2015, at Bellator 145. He lost the fight via unanimous decision, dropping the Bellator Featherweight Championship after two successful defenses.

After his brother's knockout loss to Michael Chandler, Freire moved up to the lightweight division to earn a title shot in order to face Chandler. He faced Benson Henderson in the main event at Bellator 160 on August 26, 2016. The bout ended in anticlimactic fashion as Freire stopped himself early in round two to declare he had sustained a leg injury.  As a result, Henderson was awarded a TKO victory due to injury. It was revealed post-fight that Freire had broken his shin in the first round after Henderson checked a low kick with his knee.

Regaining the Bellator Featherweight World Championship
Freire faced Daniel Straus in a fourth fight for the Bellator featherweight championship at Bellator 178 on April 21, 2017. After a back and forth first round, Freire won the bout via guillotine choke early in the second round to become the two-time Bellator Featherweight World Champion. Freire was later fined $2,500 for jumping onto the cage, following his submission victory.

Freire was scheduled to make his first title defense against Daniel Weichel, in a rematch, at Bellator 188 on November 16, 2017. Freire pulled out of the fight, however, due to multiple injuries. He expressed interest in a rematch with Weichel in early 2018.

For his first title defense of his second reign, Freire faced Daniel Weichel at Bellator 203 on July 14, 2018. He won the fight by split decision.

In his second title defense, Freire faced Emmanuel Sanchez at Bellator 209 on November 15, 2018. He won the fight by unanimous decision.

Double Champion
On February 20, 2019, Bellator announced that Freire had signed a multi-year, multi-fight contract extension with the organization. In the first fight of his new deal, Freire faced Michael Chandler for the Bellator Lightweight World Championship at Bellator 221 on May 11, 2019. He won the fight via TKO in the first round to become the second Bellator fighter after Ryan Bader to hold two titles at the same time.

2021 Bellator Featherweight Grand Prix
As a first-round bout of the Bellator Featherweight World Grand Prix tournament, Freire defended his Featherweight Championship against Juan Archuleta at Bellator 228 on September 28, 2019. He won the fight by unanimous decision.

In the quarterfinals, Freire was expected to defend his Featherweight Championship against Pedro Carvalho at Bellator 241 on March 13, 2020. However, the whole event was eventually cancelled due to the prevailing COVID-19 pandemic. The bout was rebooked and took place at Bellator 252 on November 12. Freire won the fight via knockout in the first round.

In the semifinals, Freire defended his title against Emmanuel Sanchez at Bellator 255 on April 2. This was a rematch of their November 2018 bout which saw Freire win by unanimous decision. After dropping Sanchez with a flurry of punches, Freire won the bout after choking Sanchez unconscious via guillotine choke.

In the final, Freire attempted to defend his title at Bellator 263 on July 31, 2021, against undefeated A. J. McKee for the Grand Prix Title and $1 million prize. Freire was knocked down early in the fight, and lost via guillotine choke submission in round one.

On October 6, 2021, Freire announced that he vacated the Bellator Lightweight championship, not wanting to get in the way of his brother Patricky's title aspirations.

Third Bellator Featherweight Championship reign
In the first bout after losing the Featherweight title and vacating the Lightweight one, Freire rematched A. J. McKee for the Bellator Featherweight Championship on April 15, 2022, at Bellator 277. He won the bout and the title via unanimous decision.

Freire defended his title against Ádám Borics on October 1, 2022 at Bellator 286. He won the bout in convincing fashion via unanimous decision.

Freire faced reigning Rizin FF Featherweight Champion Kleber Koike Erbst in a non-title bout at Bellator MMA vs. Rizin on December 31, 2022. He won the bout by unanimous decision.

Personal life
Patrício has a wife named Teresa. They have two sons, Davi (born 2015) and Miguel (born 2020).

Championships and accomplishments
Bellator Fighting Championships
Bellator Lightweight World Championship (one time; former)
Bellator Featherweight World Championship (three times; current)
Eight successful title defenses (Overall)
Two successful title defenses (first reign)
Five successful title defenses (second reign)
One successful title defense (third reign)
Second simultaneous two-weight Champion in Bellator MMA history
First fighter in Bellator history to have four separate championship reigns
Most wins in Bellator history (22)
Most wins in Bellator Featherweight division history (21)
Most wins in Bellator title fights (12)
Most title fights in Bellator history (15)
Most fights in Bellator history (27)
Tied (with Michael Chandler) for most finishes in Bellator history (13)
Second most finishes in Bellator Featherweight division history (12)
Most knockouts in Bellator Featherweight division history (seven)
Second most submission victories in Bellator Featherweight division (five)
Bellator Season Nine Featherweight Tournament Winner
Bellator Season Four Featherweight Tournament Winner
Bellator Season Two Featherweight Tournament Runner-up
Bleacher Report
2011 MMA All-Star First Team
MMA Junkie
November 2015 Fight of the Month vs. Daniel Straus on November 6

Mixed martial arts record

|-
|Win
|align=center| 35–5
|Kleber Koike Erbst
|Decision (unanimous)
|Bellator MMA vs. Rizin
|
|align=center| 3
|align=center| 5:00
|Saitama, Japan
|
|-
|Win
|align=center|34–5
|Ádám Borics
|Decision (unanimous)
|Bellator 286
|
|align=center|5
|align=center|5:00
|Long Beach, California, United States
|
|-
|Win
|align=center|33–5
|A. J. McKee
|Decision (unanimous)
|Bellator 277
|
|align=center|5
|align=center|5:00
|San Jose, California, United States
|
|-
|Loss
|align=center|32–5
|A. J. McKee
|Technical Submission (guillotine choke)
|Bellator 263
|
|align=center|1
|align=center|1:57
|Inglewood, California, United States
|
|-
|Win
|align=center|32–4
|Emmanuel Sanchez
|Technical Submission (guillotine choke)
|Bellator 255
|
|align=center|1
|align=center|3:35
|Uncasville, Connecticut, United States
|
|-
|Win
|align=center|31–4
|Pedro Carvalho
|KO (punch)
|Bellator 252
|
|align=center|1
|align=center|2:10
|Uncasville, Connecticut, United States
|
|-
|Win
|align=center|30–4
|Juan Archuleta
|Decision (unanimous)
|Bellator 228
|
|align=center|5
|align=center|5:00
|Inglewood, California, United States
|
|-
|Win
|align=center|29–4
|Michael Chandler
|TKO (punches)
|Bellator 221
|
|align=center|1
|align=center|1:01
|Rosemont, Illinois, United States
|
|-
|Win
|align=center|28–4
|Emmanuel Sanchez
|Decision (unanimous)
|Bellator 209
|
|align=center|5
|align=center|5:00
|Tel Aviv, Israel
|
|-
|Win
|align=center|27–4
|Daniel Weichel
|Decision (split)
|Bellator 203
|
|align=center|5
|align=center|5:00
|Rome, Italy
|
|-
|Win
|align=center|26–4
|Daniel Straus
|Submission (guillotine choke)
|Bellator 178
|
|align=center|2
|align=center|0:37
|Uncasville, Connecticut, United States
|
|-
|Loss
|align=center|25–4
|Benson Henderson
| TKO (leg injury)
|Bellator 160
|
|align=center|2
|align=center|2:26
|Anaheim, California, United States
|
|-
|Win
|align=center|25–3
|Henry Corrales
|Submission (guillotine choke)
|Bellator 153
|
|align=center|2
|align=center|4:09
|Uncasville, Connecticut, United States
|
|-
|Loss
|align=center|24–3
|Daniel Straus
|Decision (unanimous)
|Bellator 145
|
|align=center|5
|align=center|5:00
|St. Louis, Missouri, United States
|
|-
|Win
|align=center|24–2
|Daniel Weichel
|KO (punch)
|Bellator 138
|
|align=center|2
|align=center|0:32
|St. Louis, Missouri, United States
|
|-
|Win
|align=center|23–2
|Daniel Straus
|Submission (rear-naked choke)
|Bellator 132
|
|align=center|4
|align=center|4:49
|Temecula, California, United States
|
|-
|Win
|align=center|22–2
|Pat Curran
|Decision (unanimous)
|Bellator 123
|
|align=center|5
|align=center|5:00
|Uncasville, Connecticut, United States
|
|-
|Win
|align=center|21–2
|Justin Wilcox
|TKO (punches)
|Bellator 108
|
|align=center|1
|align=center|2:23
|Atlantic City, New Jersey, United States
|
|-
|Win
|align=center|20–2
|Fabrício Guerreiro 
|Decision (unanimous)
|Bellator 103
|
|align=center|3
|align=center|5:00
|Mulvane, Kansas, United States
|
|-
|Win
|align=center|19–2
|Diego Nunes
|KO (punches)
|Bellator 99
|
|align=center|1
|align=center|1:19
|Temecula, California, United States
|
|-
|Win
|align=center|18–2
|Jared Downing
|TKO (punches)
|Bellator 97
|
|align=center|2
|align=center|0:54
|Rio Rancho, New Mexico, United States
|
|-
|Loss
|align=center|17–2
|Pat Curran
|Decision (split)
|Bellator 85
|
|align=center|5
|align=center|5:00 
|Irvine, California, United States
|
|-
|Win
|align=center|17–1
|Daniel Straus
|Decision (unanimous)
|Bellator 45
|
|align=center|3
|align=center|5:00
|Lake Charles, Louisiana, United States
|
|-
|Win
|align=center|16–1
|Wilson Reis
|KO (punches)
|Bellator 41
|
|align=center|3
|align=center|3:29
|Yuma, Arizona, United States
|
|-
|Win
|align=center|15–1
|Georgi Karakhanyan
|TKO (punches)
|Bellator 37
|
|align=center|3
|align=center|0:56
|Concho, Oklahoma, United States
|
|-
|Loss
|align=center|14–1
|Joe Warren
|Decision (split)
|Bellator 23
|
|align=center|3
|align=center|5:00
|Louisville, Kentucky, United States
|
|-
|Win
|align=center|14–0
|Wilson Reis
|Decision (unanimous)
|Bellator 18
|
|align=center|3
|align=center|5:00
|Monroe, Louisiana, United States
|
|-
|Win
|align=center|13–0
|William Romero
|Submission (heel hook)
|Bellator 15
|
|align=center|1
|align=center|2:01
|Uncasville, Connecticut, United States
|
|-
|Win
|align=center|12–0
|Johnny Iwasaki
|Submission (guillotine choke)
|Platinum Fight Brazil 2
|
|align=center|2
|align=center|3:27
|Rio de Janeiro, Brazil
|
|-
|Win
|align=center|11–0
|Vinicius Borba
|TKO (head kick and punches)
|Eagle Fighting Championship
|
|align=center|1
|align=center|1:24
|São Paulo, Brazil
|
|-
|Win
|align=center|10–0
|Giovani Diniz
|Submission (kimura)
|Platinum Fight Brazil
|
|align=center|1
|align=center|2:20
|Natal, Brazil
|
|-
|Win
|align=center|9–0
|Gleristone Santos
|KO (flying knee)
|Brazil Nordeste Combat
|
|align=center|1
|align=center|2:16
|Natal, Brazil
|
|-
|Win
|align=center|8–0
|Fernando Vieira
|Decision (unanimous)
|Leal Combat: Premium
|
|align=center|3
|align=center|5:00
|Natal, Brazil
|
|-
|Win
|align=center|7–0
|Paulo Mantas
|Submission (heel hook)
|Rino's FC 4
|
|align=center|1
|align=center|2:21
|Fortaleza, Brazil
|
|-
|Win
|align=center|6–0
|Jadyson Costa
|Submission (rear-naked choke)
|Leal Combat: Grand Prix
|
|align=center|1
|align=center|4:34
|Natal, Brazil
|
|-
|Win
|align=center|5–0
|Rafael Gargula
|Submission (armbar)
|Tridenium Combat
|
|align=center|2
|align=center|3:05
|Fortaleza, Brazil
|
|-
|Win
|align=center|4–0
|Joao Paulo Rodrigues 
|Submission (guillotine choke)
|Fight Ship Looking Boy 1
|
|align=center|2
|align=center|N/A
|Natal, Brazil
|
|-
|Win
|align=center|3–0
|Tarcisio Jardim
|Submission (guillotine choke)
|Octagon Fight 1
|
|align=center|2
|align=center|N/A
|Natal, Brazil
|
|-
|Win
|align=center|2–0
|Marlon Silva
|Decision (unanimous)
|Brazilian Challenger 2
|
|align=center|3
|align=center|5:00
|Natal, Brazil
|
|-
|Win
|align=center|1–0
|Dida Dida
|TKO (corner stoppage)
|Desafio: Natal vs. Nordeste
|
|align=center|1
|align=center|5:00
|Natal, Brazil
|

See also
 List of current Bellator fighters
 List of current mixed martial arts champions
 List of male mixed martial artists

References

External links
 
 

1987 births
Living people
Brazilian male mixed martial artists
Featherweight mixed martial artists
Lightweight mixed martial artists
Mixed martial artists utilizing Brazilian jiu-jitsu
Bellator male fighters
Bellator MMA champions
Brazilian practitioners of Brazilian jiu-jitsu
People awarded a black belt in Brazilian jiu-jitsu
People from Natal, Rio Grande do Norte
Sportspeople from Rio Grande do Norte